Sir Robert Anthony Bevis Durant (9 January 1928 – 18 February 2016), also known as Tony Durant, was a British Conservative Party politician.

Political career
Durant stood unsuccessfully for Rother Valley at the 1970 General Election; the seat was retained for his party by Labour's Peter Hardy. In 1971 Durant supported Thatcher's decision to end free school milk on the grounds that many children did not like it.

He was the Member of Parliament for Reading North from 1974 to 1983. After Reading's constituencies underwent boundary changes, he was the Member of Parliament for Reading West from 1983 to 1997. During his time in the Commons, he acted as a Whip. Announced in the 1991 New Year Honours he was knighted on 14 February 1991.

In 1994, he successfully campaigned for the lowering of the homosexual age of consent. 
He retired from politics at the 1997 UK General Election.

References

Durant, Robert Anthony Bevis
Durant, Robert Anthony Bevis
Durant, Robert Anthony Bevis
Durant, Robert Anthony Bevis
Durant, Robert Anthony Bevis
Durant, Robert Anthony Bevis
Durant, Robert A
Durant, Robert A
Durant, Robert A
Durant, Robert A
Durant, Robert A
Knights Bachelor
Politicians awarded knighthoods